Allotalanta lacteata is a moth in the family Cosmopterigidae. It was described by Edward Meyrick in 1914. It is found in India (Coorg) and Sri Lanka.

References

Natural History Museum Lepidoptera generic names catalog

Moths described in 1914
Cosmopteriginae
Moths of Asia
Moths of Sri Lanka